Kwon Hyeok-soo (born on October 9, 1954) is a South Korean voice actor and actor. He first made his debut as a stage actor since 1972. He joined the Munhwa Broadcasting Corporation's voice acting division in 1976. Currently, Kwon is cast in the Korea TV Edition of 24 as George Mason (24 character), replacing Xander Berkeley. He has been a freelance actor since 2013.

Roles

Broadcast TV Dubbing
24 (replacing Xander Berkeley, Korea TV Edition, MBC)
Geisters (MBC)
Chokomi (MBC)

Drama

My Cute Guys (tvN)
Marry Him If You Dare (KBS2)
Hotel King (MBC)
Beating Again (JTBC)
My Horrible Boss (JTBC)
The Vampire Detective (OCN)
Monster (MBC)
Secret Healer (JTBC)
Something About 1 Percent (Oksusu, Dramax)
Entourage (South Korean TV series) (tvN)
Father, I'll Take Care of You (MBC)
Night Light (MBC)
The Rebel (South Korean TV series) (MBC)
Queen of Mystery (KBS2)
Man to Man (TV series) (JTBC)
Bad Thief, Good Thief (MBC)
Stranger (TV series) (tvN)
The Bride of Habaek (tvN)
Children of the 20th Century (MBC)
Witch at Court (KBS2)
Black (TV series) (OCN)
Untouchable (2017 TV series) (JTBC)
A Korean Odyssey (tvN)
The Rich Son (MBC)
Come and Hug Me (MBC)
Life on Mars (South Korean TV series) (OCN)
100 Days My Prince (tvN)
Room No. 9 (tvN)
The Crowned Clown (tvN)
Spring Turns to Spring (MBC)
Item (TV series) (MBC)
The Fiery Priest (SBS)
He Is Psychometric (tvN)
Welcome to Waikiki 2 (JTBC)
The Banker (TV series) (MBC)
Special Labor Inspector (MBC)
Abyss (TV series) (tvN)
Search: WWW (tvN)
Hotel del Luna (tvN)
When the Camellia Blooms (KBS2)
Melting Me Softly (tvN)
Dr. Romantic 2 (SBS)
Money Game (TV series) (tvN)
Hospital Playlist (tvN)
Mystic Pop-up Bar (JTBC) as Company executive

Game Dubbing
Overwatch - Reinhardt (replacing Darin De Paul, Korean Edition)
StarCraft II - Arcturus Mengsk (replacing James Harper, Korean Edition)

Movie Dubbing
Bram Stoker's Dracula (replacing Keanu Reeves, Korea TV Edition, MBC)
Rush Hour (replacing Jackie Chan, Korea TV Edition, MBC)
Thunderheart (replacing Val Kilmer, Korea TV Edition, MBC)
The Ladykillers (replacing Tom Hanks, Korea TV Edition, MBC)

See also
Munhwa Broadcasting Corporation
MBC Voice Acting Division

References

External links
MBC Voice Acting Division Kwon Hyeok Soo Blog (in Korean)
Ad Sound Kwon Hyeok Soo Blog (in Korean)

Living people
South Korean male voice actors
1954 births
South Korean male television actors